Splitting Adam is an American-Canadian action comedy film that aired on February 16, 2015. The film stars Jace Norman, Jack Griffo, Isabela Moner, Tony Cavalero was directed by Scott McAboy and produced by Amy Sydorick.

Splitting Adam won Best Children's Program at the 2016 Leo Awards. Also, director Scott McAboy won Best Direction in the Children's Program category.

Plot
After accidentally stumbling into his uncle's mysterious "tanning bed", Adam (Jace Norman) learns the answer to all of his problems with multiple clones. With the help of his new creation, Adam is hopping on one wild summer ride with an epic splash. Adam's Uncle Magic Mitch (Tony Cavalero) comes to Adam's house and asks Adam to put his tanning bed into the garage. When he is leaving home to go to work, his next door neighbor tells him he needs to cut his grass to a specific length. He goes to work with Sheldon (Amarr M. Wooten) and they are on Pee/Poop patrol. When they clean themselves, they go to a meeting and Vance Hansum (Jack Griffo), his rival, taunts him about how he was spying on Lori Collins (Isabela Moner) and she tries to get people to sign up. Adam puts his hand up. However, things get worse when the clones start to degenerate and Adam must return them to the tanning bed with the help of brainiac Danny (Seth Isaac Johnson), before it's too late....

Cast
 Jace Norman as Adam Baker
 Isabela Moner as Lori Collins
 Jack Griffo as Vance Hansum
 Amarr M. Wooten as Sheldon
 Seth Isaac Johnson as Danny
 Tate Chapman as Gillian Baker
 Tony Cavalero as Uncle Mitch/Magic Mitch

Production
This film was shot on location in Cultus Lake, Canada including Cultus Lake Waterpark. Principal photography took place during the week of June 2nd until June 6th, 2014.

See also
 Multiplicity
 The Other Me

References

External links

2010s children's comedy films
2015 television films
2015 films
American children's comedy films
Canadian children's comedy films
Canadian television films
English-language Canadian films
Films about cloning
Films scored by James Dooley
Nickelodeon original films
2010s Canadian films
2010s American films